INNA-051 is a COVID-19 vaccine candidate developed by Ena Respiratory.

References 

Clinical trials
Australian COVID-19 vaccines
Viral vector vaccines